Karola Jovanović (Карола Јовановић) (1879 – January 1958 in Vienna) was an Austrian operatic soprano.

Life 
From 1904 to 1905 she was active as a singer in Czechoslovakia, at the city theatre of Olmütz. She then worked as a singer at the Oper Frankfurt until 1906 and then at the Graz Opera until 1911. After 1911, she went to the Vienna State Opera, where she had already made guest appearances in 1909 and 1911, and remained there until 1932, sometimes casting the role of the nymph Echo in the October 1916 premiere of the second version of Richard Strauss's opera Ariadne auf Naxos.

Other operatic roles included Marie in Der Waffenschmied by Albert Lortzing, Marzelline in Beethoven's only opera Fidelio,  Anna in The Merry Wives of Windsor by Otto Nicolai, Gretel in Hänsel und Gretel and that of Cio-Cio-San in Madama Butterfly by Puccini.

Further reading 
 Uwe Harten: Jovanivic, Karola. In Oesterreichisches Musiklexikon. Online-edition, Vienna 2002 ff., ; Print edition: Vol. 2, edition of the Austrian Academy of Sciences, Vienna 2003, .
 Karl-Josef Kutsch, Leo Riemens: Großes Sängerlexikon. Volume 3: Franc–Kaidanoff, . Fourth, expanded and updated edition. Munich 2003, 
 Wilhelm Beetz: Das Wiener Opernhaus. 1869 bis 1945. Zürich 1949

References

External links 
 
 Jovanovic Karola on Operissimo 
 Pictures databank – Karola Jovanovic at Kunsthistorisches Museum

Austrian operatic sopranos
20th-century Austrian women opera singers
Austro-Hungarian singers
1879 births
1958 deaths
Place of birth missing